The First Presbyterian Church in Bridgewater, South Dakota was listed on the National Register of Historic Places in 2013.

Designed by architect Walter J. Dixon, it was deemed notable as a rare example of Prairie School-style church building in South Dakota.  The building was completed in 1928.

References

National Register of Historic Places in South Dakota
Prairie School architecture in South Dakota
Churches completed in 1928
McCook County, South Dakota
Presbyterian churches in South Dakota